Paralta Plays was a film company in the United States in 1917-1918. It adopted its own distribution system. The company lasted about a year.

Filmography
Alimony (1917 film)
A Man's Man (1918)
Rose o' Paradise (1918)
Madam Who? (1918)
Shackled (1918)
One Dollar Bid (1918)
Wedlock (1918)
His Robe of Honor (1918)
Patriotism (1918 film) (1918)
A Burglar for a Night (1918)
The Turn of a Card (1918)
Humdrum Brown (1918), distributor
With Hoops of Steel (1918)
Maid o' the Storm (1918)
Within the Cup (1918)
An Alien Enemy (1918)
The One Woman based on The One Woman: A Story of Modern Utopia, a 1903 novel by Thomas Dixon Jr.

References

External links
Wikimapia entry 

Defunct film and television production companies of the United States